Georgia Shakespeare (formerly Georgia Shakespeare Festival) was a professional, not-for-profit theatre company located in Atlanta, Georgia, in the United States on the campus of Oglethorpe University from 1985-2014. Georgia Shakespeare produced three plays annually, primarily between June and November. Twelve educational programs were developed in the history of Georgia Shakespeare. These programs included "The High School Tour", a "High School Acting Competition", "Camp Shakespeare", a "High School Conservatory", a "No Fear Shakespeare" training program for educators, after school residencies, school tours, student matinees, classes for professionals, and in-school workshops. At its peak, it welcomed 60,000 patrons annually to its performances.

History

1985–1989
Georgia Shakespeare was founded in 1985 by Lane Anderson, Richard Garner, and Robert Watson under the name Georgia Shakespeare Festival.  The company produced two plays each year, with its first offering being productions  of The Taming of the Shrew and King Lear in rotating repertory starting July 10, 1986. The rising theatre company went through several locations in its first years.  Its first season was on the Oglethorpe University front athletic field in a rectangular, white 60' X 90' tent with a seating capacity of 300. The theatre changed tents for its second season and was housed in a circular tent with a 90' diameter. This new tent increased the seating capacity by 50. For the theatre's fifth season, it moved into a 110' diameter circular tent that seated 400.

1990–1999
In 1991, Georgia Shakespeare expanded to three plays annually, and performed an adaptation of The Three Musketeers as its first work not written by William Shakespeare.  In later years, the company has performed between three and seven plays per season. Georgia Shakespeare opened its 1997 season in the $5.7 million John A. and Miriam H. Conant Performing Arts Center with The Tempest. The Conant Center has a 509-seat modified thrust stage and it was this move that allowed the addition of a fall performance to the season schedule.

2000–2009
In 2001, Georgia Shakespeare became a member of the League of Resident Theaters and Shakespeare Theatre Association of America. At the time, it was one of only two theatres in the state of Georgia to be a part of this league. In 2004, Professor Andrew James Hartley, Distinguished Professor of Shakespeare Studies at the University of North Carolina at Charlotte, was appointed the company's first resident dramaturg (having served a similar long0time role in a production-to-production basis). In 2005, he published a book, The Shakespearean Dramaturg: A Theoretical and Practical Guide, based on his eight years experience dramaturging in the American southeast.

2010–2014
In 2011, mired in debt, the theatre launched a 'Save Georgia Shakespeare' campaign which was successful in raising over $500,000. When Georgia Shakespeare was still performing under a tent, patrons of the theatre started bringing pre-show picnics. This became a tradition and when the Conant Performing Arts Center was built, a covered area with tables and chairs was set aside for picnics. In 2014, the grounds underwent a renovation funded through several Atlanta-area private foundations. In 2014, the theatre company closed for good in the middle of its 29th season, unable to stay open due to its high debts.

Productions 
1986
 The Taming of the Shrew
 King Lear
1987
 Much Ado About Nothing
 Romeo & Juliet
1988
 A Midsummer Night's Dream
 The Winter's Tale
1989
 Twelfth Night
 The Comedy of Errors
1990
 Macbeth
 As You Like It
1991
 The Three Musketeers
 Richard III
 Two Gentlemen of Verona
1992
 Love's Labour's Lost
 The Tempest
 Hamlet: Godfather Of Brooklyn
1993
 Cyrano de Bergerac
 SHREW: The Musical
 Henry V
1994
 A Midsummer Night's Dream
 The Merchant of Venice
 The Imaginary Invalid
1995
 Much Ado About Nothing
 The Country Wife
 Booth, Brother Booth
 King Lear
1996
 Twelfth Night: A New Musical
 The Bourgeois Gentleman
 Troilus and Cressida
 Booth, Brother Booth
1997
 The Tempest
 The School for Scandal
 Othello
1998
 Henry IV, Part I
 The Miser
 Measure for Measure
 Macbeth
1999
 Hamlet
 The Comedy of Errors
 St. Joan
 Romeo & Juliet
 SHREW: The Holiday Musical
2000
 Twelfth Night
 Tartuffe
 Richard II
 A Midsummer Night's Dream
 Readings: Epicoene (Ben Jonson), The Changeling (Thomas Middleton/William Rowley), The History of King Lear (Nathum Tate)
2001
 Amadeus
 As You Like It
 The Winter's Tale
 Julius Caesar
 Readings: The Inland Sea (Naomi Wallace), Thyestes (Seneca), Mandragola (Machiavelli), A Mad World My Masters (Thomas Middleton), The Revenger's Tragedy (Thomas Middleton), The Widow (Thomas Middleton)
2002
 The Two Gentlemen of Verona
 Death of a Salesman
 The Merry Wives of Windsor
 The Taming of the Shrew
 The Gospel of John
 Booth, Brother Booth
 Readings: The Tamer Tamed (Fletcher)
2003
 Much Ado About Nothing
 The School for Wives
 The Tale of Cymbeline
 The Tempest
2004
 Shake at the Lake: A Midsummer Night's Dream
 Cyrano de Bergerac
 What the Butler Saw
 Coriolanus
 Macbeth
2005
 Shake at the Lake: Macbeth
 The Comedy of Errors
 A Streetcar Named Desire
 The Cherry Orchard
 The Gospel of John
 Romeo & Juliet
2006
 Shake at the Lake: The Comedy of Errors
 Hamlet
 Twelfth Night
 Treasure Island
 Metamorphoses
 Othello
2007
 Shake at the Lake: Twelfth Night
 Metamorphoses
 The Servant of Two Masters
 Pericles
 Robin Hood
 Loot
 Richard III
2008
 Shake at the Lake: The Servant of Two Masters
 As You Like It
 The Merchant of Venice
 All's Well That Ends Well
 Tom Thumb the Great
 Antigone
2009
 A Midsummer Night's Dream
 Cat on a Hot Tin Roof
 Titus Andronicus
 Alice in Wonderland
 Julius Caesar
2010
 Shake at the Lake: A Midsummer Night's Dream
 Shrew: The Musical
 Love's Labour's Lost
 King Lear
 The Legend of the Sword in the Stone
 The Odyssey: a Journey Home
 A Christmas Story
 The Gospel of John
 Prophets
2011
 The Tempest
 Antony & Cleopatra
 Noises Off
 The Jungle Book
 The Glass Menagerie
 Paul Robeson
2012
 Shakespeare in the Park: The Tempest
 Ilyria: A Twelfth Night Musical
 Much Ado About Nothing
 The Importance of Being Earnest
 The Emperor and the Nightingale
 Macbeth
2013
 Shakespeare in the Park: Much Ado About Nothing
 Metamorphoses
 Mighty Myths & Legends
 Hamlet
2014 (Final Season)
 Shakespeare in the Park: As You Like It
 One Man, Two Guvnors
 The Frog Prince

References

External links 
 Georgia Shakespeare Festival Collection, MS 37, Archives, Philip Weltner Library, Oglethorpe University, Atlanta, Georgia.

League of Resident Theatres
Shakespeare festivals in the United States
Shakespearean theatre companies
Theatre in Atlanta
Theatres in Atlanta
Theatres in Georgia (U.S. state)
Oglethorpe University